The Goldman House is a historic building at 143 School Street in the North Stelton section of Piscataway, New Jersey. Built in 1915 by Samuel Goldman, it was part of the Ferrer Modern School Colony. The house was added to the National Register of Historic Places on October 1, 2010, for its significance in art and social history from 1915 to 1953.

References

Further reading
Smith-Peter, Susan (2021). "Guns for Lenin: A New Jersey Love Story" Blog at New York University's Jordan Center for the Advanced Study of Russia. https://jordanrussiacenter.org/news/guns-for-lenin-a-new-jersey-love-story/#.YC1T7mNOmfU

Smith-Peter,Susan (2019). "The Goldman House: Art to the Exaggerated and Eccentric," Weird NJ 52 (May–October 2019): 34–38.

National Register of Historic Places in Middlesex County, New Jersey
Houses on the National Register of Historic Places in New Jersey
New Jersey Register of Historic Places
Houses completed in 1915
Houses in Middlesex County, New Jersey
Piscataway, New Jersey